Walter Francis White (July 1, 1893 – March 21, 1955) was an American civil rights activist who led the National Association for the Advancement of Colored People (NAACP) for a quarter of a century, 1929–1955, after joining the organization as an investigator in 1918. He directed a broad program of legal challenges to racial segregation and disfranchisement. He was also a journalist, novelist, and essayist. He graduated in 1916 from Atlanta University.

In 1918, White joined the small national staff of the NAACP in New York at the invitation of James Weldon Johnson. He acted as Johnson's assistant national secretary and traveled to the South to investigate lynchings and riots. Being fair skinned, at times he passed as white to facilitate his investigations and protect himself in tense situations. White succeeded Johnson as the head of the NAACP, leading the organization from 1929 to 1955. He joined the Advisory Council for the Government of the Virgin Islands in 1934 and resigned in 1935 to protest President Roosevelt's silence at Southern Democrats' blocking of anti-lynching legislation to avoid retaliatory obstruction of his New Deal policies.

White oversaw the plans and organizational structure of the fight against public segregation. He worked with President Truman on desegregating the armed forces after the Second World War and gave him a draft for the Executive Order to implement this. Under White's leadership, the NAACP set up its Legal Defense Fund, which conducted numerous legal challenges to segregation and disfranchisement, and achieved many successes.  Among these was the Supreme Court ruling in Brown v. Board of Education (1954), which determined that segregated education was inherently unequal. White also quintupled NAACP membership to nearly 500,000.

Early life

Walter was the son of George and Madeline White. By the time he was born, his father had attended Atlanta University, which is still known today as one of the South's historically black colleges, and became a postal worker, an admired position in the federal government. His mother had graduated from the same institution and became a teacher. (She had been briefly married in 1879 to Marshall King, who died the same year.) White received a good education growing up. He attended the Atlanta public schools, finished the Atlanta University high school in 1912, and the college there in the class of 1916. This period of study enabled White to spend eight years in the old Atlanta's unusual atmosphere at its zenith. There he was exposed to instruction which had been enriched by a decade of W. E. B. Du Bois' research. Undoubtedly White's life work reflected on the "Old Atlanta University's pioneer and still unequaled contributions in Southern colored institutions of higher learning." The White family belonged to the influential First Congregational Church, founded after the Civil War by freedmen and the American Missionary Association, based in the North. Of all the black denominations in Georgia, the Congregationalists were among the most socially, politically and financially powerful. Membership in First Congregational was the ultimate status symbol in Atlanta. 

Of mixed race with African and European ancestry on both sides, White had features showing the latter. He emphasized in his autobiography, A Man Called White (p. 3): "I am a Negro. My skin is white, my eyes are blue, my hair is blond. The traits of my race are nowhere visible upon me." Of his 32 great-great-great-grandparents, only five were black, and the other 27 were white.  All members of his immediate family had fair skin, and his mother, Madeline, was also blue-eyed and blonde. The oral history of his mother's family asserts that her maternal grandparents were Dilsia, an enslaved woman concubine, and her owner, William Henry Harrison. Harrison had six children with Dilsia and, much later, was elected president of the United States in 1840, only to serve for 31 days. Madeline's mother, Marie Harrison, was one of Dilsia's daughters with Harrison. Held in enslavement in La Grange, Georgia, where she had been sold, Marie became a concubine to Augustus Ware. The wealthy white man bought her a house, had four children with her, and passed on some wealth to them. White and his family identified as Negro and lived among Atlanta's Negro community (despite White and his siblings inheriting a bit less than 16 percent African ancestry and being able to pass as white).

George and Madeline White took a kind but firm approach in rearing their children, encouraging hard work and regular schedules. In his autobiography, White relates that his parents ran a strict schedule on Sundays; they locked him in his room for silent prayer, a time so boring that he almost begged to do homework. His father forbade Walter from reading any books less than 25 years old so he chose to read Dickens, Thackeray, and Trollope by the time he was 12. When he was 8, he threw a rock at a white child who called him a derogatory name for drinking from the fountain reserved for black people. Events such as this shaped White's self-identity. He began to develop skills to pass for white, which he used later to preserve his safety as a civil rights activist in the South.

Career
White was educated at Atlanta University, a historically black college. W. E. B. Du Bois had already moved to the North before White enrolled, but Du Bois knew White's parents well. Du Bois had taught two of White's older siblings at Atlanta University. Du Bois and Walter White later disagreed about how best to gain civil rights for black people, but they shared a vision for the country. (See Atlanta Conference of Negro Problems.)

After graduating in 1916, White took a position with the Standard Life Insurance Company, one of the new and most successful businesses started by black people in Atlanta.

He also worked to organize a chapter of the National Association for the Advancement of Colored People (NAACP), which had been founded in 1909. He and other leaders were successful in getting the Atlanta School Board to support improving education for black children, who were taught in segregated schools, which were traditionally underfunded by the white-dominated legislature. (Black people had been effectively disfranchised at the turn of the century by Georgia's passage of a new constitution making voter registration more difficult, as did all the other former Confederate states.)

At the invitation of activist and writer James Weldon Johnson, 25-year-old White moved to New York City. In 1918, he started working at the national headquarters of the NAACP. White began as secretary assistant of the NAACP; Du Bois and other leaders got over their concerns about his youth. White became an undercover agent in investigating lynchings in the South, which were at a peak. With his keen investigative skills and light complexion, White proved to be the NAACP's secret weapon against white mob violence.

White passed as white as a NAACP investigator, finding both more safety in hostile environments and gaining free communication with white people in cases of violations of civil and human rights. He sometimes became involved in Klan groups in the South to expose those involved in lynchings and other murders. In the Little Rock, Arkansas, area he escaped on a train, having been harbored by several prominent black families because of threats that a black man "passing for white" was being hunted down to be lynched. The NAACP publicized information about these crimes, but virtually none was ever prosecuted by local or state southern governments.

To become a popular leader, White had to compete with the appeal of Marcus Garvey; he learned to display a skillful verbal dexterity. Roy Wilkins, his successor at the NAACP, said, "White was one of the best talkers I've ever heard."

Throughout his career, Walter White spoke out against segregation and discrimination but also black nationalism. Most notably, White and Du Bois's 1934 conflict was over the latter's endorsement of black people's voluntary separation within US society.

Marriage and family
White married Gladys Powell in 1922. They had two children, Jane White, who became an actress on Broadway and television; and Walter Carl White, who lived in Germany for much of his adult life. The Whites' 27-year marriage ended in divorce in 1949.

Because White was a public figure of a noted African-American rights organization, he generated great public controversy shortly after his divorce by marrying Poppy Cannon, a divorced white South African woman, who was a magazine editor with connections in the emerging television industry. Many of his black colleagues and acquaintances were offended. Some claimed the leader had always wanted to be white; others said he had always been white.

Gladys and their children broke off with White and his second wife. White's sister said that he had wanted all along simply to pass as a white person. His son changed his name to Carl Darrow, signifying his disgust and desire to separate himself from his father.

Marie Harrison
Marie Harrison was White's grandmother. Harrison was born into slavery to a mother named Dilsia. Harrison was fathered by future President William Henry Harrison. According to White's oral history, when Harrison decided to run for president, he concluded that it would not be politically advantageous for him to have "bastard slave children" in his home. So, he gave four of Dilsia's children (including Marie Harrison) to his brother. His brother sold them to Joseph Poythress, one of the earliest white settlers of LaGrange, Georgia.

NAACP

Investigating riots and lynchings
White used his appearance to increase his effectiveness in conducting investigations of lynchings and race riots in the American South. He could "pass" and talk to white people as one of them, but he could talk to black people as one of them and identified with them. Such work was dangerous: "Through 1927 White would investigate 41 lynchings, 8 race riots, and two cases of widespread peonage, risking his life repeatedly in the backwaters of Florida, the piney woods of Georgia, and in the cotton fields of Arkansas."
In his autobiography, A Man Called White, he dedicates an entire chapter to a time when he almost joined the Ku Klux Klan undercover. White became a master of incognito investigating. He started with a letter from a friend who recruited new members of the KKK.  After correspondence between him and Edward Young Clark, leader of the KKK, Clark tried to interest White in joining. Invited to Atlanta to meet with other Klan leaders, White declined, fearing that he would be at risk of his life if his true identity were discovered. White used the access to Klan leaders to further his investigation into the "sinister and illegal conspiracy against human and civil rights which the Klan was concocting." After deeper inquiries into White's life, Clark stopped sending signed letters. White was threatened by anonymous letters that stated his life would be in danger if he ever divulged any of the confidential information he had received. By then, White had already turned the information over to the U.S. Department of Justice and New York Police Department. He believed that undermining the hold of mob violence would be crucial to his cause.

White first investigated the October 1919 Elaine Race Riot, where white vigilantes and Federal troops in Phillips County, Arkansas killed between 100 and 237 black sharecroppers. The case had both labor and racial aspects. Black sharecroppers were meeting on issues related to organizing with an agrarian union, which white vigilantes were attempting to suppress. They had established guards because of the threat, and a white man was killed. The white militias had come to the town and hunted down black people in retaliation for that death and to suppress the labor movement.

During the Tulsa race massacre, White was inadvertently deputized. One of his fellow deputies told him he could shoot any black person and the law would be behind him.

Granted press credentials from the Chicago Daily News, White gained an interview with Arkansas Governor Charles Hillman Brough, who would not have met with him as the NAACP representative. Brough gave White a letter of recommendation to help him meet people and his autographed photograph.

Learning that his identity was discovered, White was in Phillips County briefly before taking the first train back to Little Rock. The conductor told him that he was leaving "just when the fun is going to start" because they had found out that there was a "damned yellow nigger down here passing for white and the boys are going to get him." Asked what they would do to him, the conductor told White, "When they get through with him he won't pass for white no more!" "High yellow" is a term used to refer to black people of mixed-racial descent and visible European features.

White published his findings about the riot and trial in the Daily News, the Chicago Defender, and The Nation, as well as the NAACP's own magazine, The Crisis. Governor Brough asked the United States Postal Service to prohibit mailings of the Chicago Defender and The Crisis to Arkansas, and others tried to get an injunction against distribution of the Defender at the local level.

The NAACP provided legal defense of the black men convicted by the state for the riot and carried the case to the U.S. Supreme Court. Its ruling overturned the Elaine convictions and established important precedent about the conduct of trials. The Supreme Court found that the original trial was held under conditions that adversely affected the defendants' rights. Some of the courtroom audience were armed, as was a mob outside, so there was intimidation of the court and jury. The 79 black defendants had been quickly tried and convicted by an all-white jury: 12 were found guilty of murder and sentenced to death; 67 were condemned to sentences from 20 years to life. No white man was prosecuted for any of the many black deaths.

Scottsboro Trial
White's first major struggle as leader of the NAACP centered on the Scottsboro Trial in 1931. It was also a case that tested the competition between the NAACP and the American Communist Party to represent the black community. The NAACP and Walter White wanted to increase their following in the black community. Weeks after White started in his new position at the NAACP, nine black teenagers looking for work were arrested after a fight with a group of white teens as the train both groups were riding on passed through Scottsboro, Alabama. Two white girls accused the nine black teenagers of rape.

Locked in a cell awaiting trial, the "Scottsboro boys looked to be prime lynching material: dirt poor, illiterate, and of highly questionable moral character even for teenagers." The Communist Party and the NAACP both hoped to prove themselves as the party to represent the black community. Scottsboro was an important battle ground for the two groups. The Communists had to destroy black citizens' faith in the NAACP in order to take control of leadership, and they believed that a Scottsboro victory was a way to solidify this superior role over the NAACP. Their case against the NAACP was easier, as White and other leaders were second in approaching the case after the International Labor Defense. Ultimately, the differing approaches to the case demonstrated the conflicting ideals between the two organizations. To White, "Communism meant that blacks have two strikes against them: blacks were aliens in white society where skin color was more important than initiative or intelligence, and blacks would also be Reds which meant a double dose of hatred from white Americans." White believed the NAACP had to keep distance and independence from the Communist Party for this reason. Ultimately, the Communist leaders failed to consolidate their position with black people.

White said: "The shortsightedness of the Communist leaders in the United States (led to their eventual failure); Had they been more intelligent, honest, and truthful there is no way of estimating how deeply they might have penetrated into Negro life and consciousness." White meant the Communist's philosophy of branding anyone opposed to their platform was their failure. He believed the NAACP had the best defense counsel in the country, but the Scottsboro boys' families chose to go with the ILD partly because they were first on the scene.

White believed in capitalist America and used communist propaganda as leverage to promote his own cause in securing civil liberties. He advised white America to reconsider its position of unfair treatment because they might find the black population choosing radical alternative methods of protest. Ultimately, White and other NAACP leaders decided to continue involvement with the Scottsboro boys since it was only one of many efforts they had.

In his autobiography, White gave a critical summary of the injustice in Scottsboro:

In the intervening years it had become increasingly clear that the tragedy of a Scottsboro lies, not in the bitterly cruel injustice which it works upon its immediate victims, but also, and perhaps even more, in the cynical use of human misery by Communists in propagandizing Communism, and in the complacency with which a democratic government views the basic evils from which such a case arises. A majority of Americans still ignore, the plain implications in similar tragedies.

Anti-lynching legislation
White was a strong proponent and supporter of federal anti-lynching bills, which were unable to surmount the opposition by the Southern Democrats in the Senate. One of White's many surveys showed that 46 of 50 lynchings during the first six months of 1919 were black victims, 10 of whom were burned at the stake. After the Chicago Race Riot of 1919, White, like Ida Wells-Barnett, concluded the causes of such violence were not rape of a white woman by a black man, as was often rumored, but rather the result of "prejudice and economic competition."

That was also the conclusion of a Chicago city commission, which investigated the 1919 rioting; it noted specifically that ethnic Irish in South Chicago had led the anti-black attacks. The Irish were considered highly political and strongly territorial against other groups, including more recent white immigrants from eastern Europe.

In the late 1910s, newspapers reported a decreasing number of southern lynchings but postwar violence in Northern and Midwestern cities increased under the competition for work and housing by returning veterans, immigrants and black migrants. In the Great Migration, hundreds of thousands of black people were leaving the South for jobs in the North. The Pennsylvania Railroad recruited tens of thousands of workers from Florida alone.

Rural violence also continued. White investigated violence in 1918 in Lowndes and Brooks counties, Georgia. The worst case was when "a pregnant black woman [was] tied to a tree and burned alive after which (the mob) split her open, and her child, still alive, was thrown to the ground and stomped by some of the members."

White lobbied for federal anti-lynching bills during his time as leader of the NAACP. In 1922, the Dyer Anti-Lynching Bill was passed overwhelmingly by the House, the "first piece of legislation passed by the House of Representatives since Reconstruction that specifically protected blacks from lynchings." Congress never passed the Dyer bill, as the Senate was controlled by Southerners who opposed it.

Black people were then largely disfranchised in southern states, which were politically controlled by white Democrats. At the turn of the 20th century, the state legislatures had passed discriminatory laws and constitutions that effectively created  barriers to voter registration and closed black people out of the political process. White sponsored other civil rights legislation, which was also defeated by the Southern bloc: the Castigan-Wagner bill of 1935, the Gavagan bill of 1937, and the VanNuys bill of 1940. Southerners had to mount a major political and financial effort to take the Castigan-Wagner bill out of consideration and to defeat the Gavagan bill.

White had become a powerful figure: segregationist senator James F. Byrnes of South Carolina said in session about the Dyer bill, "One Negro has ordered this bill to pass. If Walter White should consent to have this bill laid aside its advocates would desert it as quickly as football players unscramble when the whistle of the referee is heard." White's word was the only thing that kept the bill before Congress. Although the bill did not pass the Senate, White and the NAACP secured widespread public support for the cause. By 1938, a Gallup poll found that 72% of Americans and 57% of Southerners favored an anti-lynching bill. White also contributed to creating alliances among civil rights activists, many of whom went on to lead in the movement from the 1950s.

Attacks on Paul Robeson
During the McCarthy era, White did not openly criticize McCarthy's campaign in Congress against communists, which was wide-ranging. American fears of communism were heightened, and the FBI had been trying to classify civil rights activists as communists. White feared a backlash that might cost the NAACP its tax-exempt status and end up with people equating civil rights with communism.<ref>Mark Newman, "Civil Rights and Human Rights", review of Carol Andersen's Eyes Off the Prize: The United Nations and the African American Struggle for Human Rights, 1944–1955, in 'Reviews in American History, Vol. 32, No. 2, June 2004, pp. 247–254, accessed April 12, 2008.</ref>

White criticized singer/activist Paul Robeson, who admitted to pro-Soviet leanings. Together with Roy Wilkins, the editor of The Crisis, he arranged for distribution of "Paul Robeson: Lost Shepherd", a leaflet against Robeson, which was written under a pseudonym.

Literary career
Through his cultural interests and his close friendships with white literary power brokers Carl Van Vechten and Alfred A. Knopf, White was one of the founders of the "New Negro" cultural flowering. Popularly known as the Harlem Renaissance, the period was one of intense literary and artistic production. Harlem became the center of black American intellectual and artistic life. It attracted creative people from across the nation, as did New York City in general.

Writer Zora Neale Hurston accused Walter White of stealing her designed costumes from her play The Great Day. White never returned the costumes to Hurston, who repeatedly asked for them by mail.

After Hattie McDaniel was the first African-American to win an Oscar, the 1939 Academy Award for Best Supporting Actress in Gone with the Wind and beating Olivia de Havilland, White accused her of being an Uncle Tom. McDaniel responded that she would "rather make seven hundred dollars a week playing a maid than seven dollars being one"; she further questioned White's qualification to speak on behalf of blacks, since he was light-skinned and only one-eighth black.

White was the author of critically acclaimed novels: Fire in the Flint (1924) and Flight (1926).  His non-fiction book Rope and Faggot: A Biography of Judge Lynch (1929) was a study of lynching. Additional books were A Rising Wind (1945), his autobiography A Man Called White (1948), and How Far the Promised Land (1955). Unfinished at his death was Blackjack, a novel on Harlem life and the career of an African-American boxer.

Awards and honors
 1927 – White received the Harmon Award (William E. Harmon Foundation Award for Distinguished Achievement among Negroes) for his book Rope and Faggot: An Interview with Judge Lynch, a study of lynching.
 1937 – Awarded the Spingarn Medal by the NAACP, for outstanding achievement by an African American.
 2002 – Molefi Kete Asante listed Walter Francis White on his list of 100 Greatest African Americans.
 2009 – White was inducted into the Georgia Writers Hall of Fame.

Death
White died of a heart attack in New York City on March 21, 1955. He was 61.

See also

 List of civil rights leaders

References

Further reading
 Baime, A.J., White Lies: The Double Life of Walter F. White and America's Darkest Secret. New York: Mariner Books, 2022.
 Cortner, Richard C., A Mob Intent on Death: The NAACP and the Arkansas Riot Cases. Middletown, CT: Wesleyan University Press, 1988.
 Kluger, Richard. Simple Justice. New York: Knopf Doubleday Publishing Group, 1977.
 Zangrando, Robert L. and Ronald L. Lewis, Walter F. White: The NAACP's Ambassador for Racial Justice. Morgantown, WV: West Virginia University Press, 2019.

External links

 
 Stuart A. Rose Manuscript, Archives, and Rare Book Library, Emory University: Walter and Gladys Powell White family papers, 1890-2010
 Walter Francis White and Poppy Cannon Papers. Yale Collection of American Literature, Beinecke Rare Book and Manuscript Library.
 Part of his life is retold in the radio drama "Investigator For Democracy", a presentation from Destination Freedom''

1893 births
1955 deaths
African-American activists
NAACP activists
African-American journalists
Journalists from New York City
African-American writers
American anti-lynching activists
Clark Atlanta University alumni
Harlem Renaissance
Harrison family of Virginia
People from Atlanta
Spingarn Medal winners
William Henry Harrison
Writers from Georgia (U.S. state)
Writers from New York City
Activists from New York (state)
20th-century American writers
Activists from Georgia (U.S. state)
American anti-communists